The 1978 Liberty Bowl, a college football postseason bowl game, took place on December 23, 1978, at Liberty Bowl Memorial Stadium in Memphis, Tennessee. The competing teams in the 20th edition of the Liberty Bowl were the LSU Tigers of the Southeastern Conference (SEC) and the Missouri Tigers of the Big Eight Conference. Missouri defeated LSU by a final score of 20–15.

Teams

LSU

The 1978 LSU squad finished the regular season with a record of 8–3 and losses against Alabama, Georgia and Mississippi State. The appearance marked the first for LSU in the Liberty Bowl, and the school's 21st overall bowl game.

Missouri

The 1978 Missouri squad finished the regular season with a record of 7–4 and losses against Alabama, Colorado, Oklahoma and Oklahoma State. The appearance marked the first for Missouri in the Liberty Bowl, and the school's fifteenth overall bowl game.

Game summary

Scoring summary

Source:

Statistics

Aftermath
Each program later returned to the Liberty Bowl: Missouri lost to Purdue in 1980, then lost to Oklahoma State in 2018, while LSU fell to Baylor in 1985.

Missouri joined the Southeastern Conference (SEC) in 2012 after playing 16 seasons in the Big 12, which was formed in 1996 when four schools from the former Southwest Conference combined with the Big Eight.

LSU defeated Missouri, 42–7, at Baton Rouge on October 1, 2016, in the first regular season meeting between the schools in what was also Ed Orgeron's first game as LSU head coach. Four years later, Eli Drinkwitz earned his first victory as Missouri coach with a 45-41 decision over LSU at Columbia. The game was originally scheduled for Baton Rouge, but moved three days prior to kickoff due to the approach of Hurricane Delta to the Louisiana coast.

References

Liberty Bowl
Liberty Bowl
LSU Tigers football bowl games
Missouri Tigers football bowl games
Liberty Bowl
December 1978 sports events in the United States